Bob Rommel (born November 30, 1962) is an American politician who has served in the Florida House of Representatives as the member for the 106th district since 2016.

References

1962 births
Living people
21st-century American politicians
Republican Party members of the Florida House of Representatives
People from Red Bank, New Jersey